Alfons Supersaxo (28 March 1926 – 1 May 2005) was a Swiss Nordic skier who competed in the late 1940s and early 1950s.

He died in Saas-Fee.

At the 1952 Winter Olympics, he finished tenth in the Nordic combined event and 26th in the 18 km cross-country skiing event. Supersaxo also competed in the 1948 Winter Olympics in St. Moritz, finishing 34th in the 18 km event.

External links
Olympic cross country skiing 18 km results: 1948-52
Olympic nordic combined results: 1948-64

1926 births
2005 deaths
Swiss male cross-country skiers
Swiss male Nordic combined skiers
Olympic cross-country skiers of Switzerland
Olympic Nordic combined skiers of Switzerland
Cross-country skiers at the 1948 Winter Olympics
Cross-country skiers at the 1952 Winter Olympics
Nordic combined skiers at the 1948 Winter Olympics
Nordic combined skiers at the 1952 Winter Olympics